Santhosham() is a 1998 Indian Tamil-language drama film directed by newcomer Karthik. The film stars Saravanan and Suvalakshmi, with K. S. Ravikumar, Anand Babu, Prakash Raj, R. Sundarrajan and Thalaivasal Vijay playing supporting roles. It was released on 3 April 1998.

Plot

Indran (Saravanan) is a jobless young man despite being a gold medalist graduate. Without revenue, he collapses under debt and has always bad luck so people who know him neglects him. Only Bhavani (Suvalakshmi) befriends him. One day, he meets his college friend Karthik (Anand Babu) who works for the minister Nadesan and Karthik promises to find him a decent job in politics. During the interview, his bad luck continued. Later, with the help of Bhavani, he becomes an auto rickshaw driver. Someday, he carries a pregnant lady in his auto rickshaw to the hospital. The next day, the father of the pregnant lady comes to congrats him for this good deed and gives him a decent job in his company. Then, Indran proposes his love to Bhavani and she accepts to marry him. Finally, Indran gets married with Bhavani and he becomes the happiest man in the world but the happiness was short-lived. What transpires next forms the rest of the story.

Cast

Saravanan as Indran
Suvalakshmi as Bhavani
K. S. Ravikumar
Anand Babu as Karthik
Prakash Raj as Nadesan
R. Sundarrajan
Thalaivasal Vijay as Kanthaswamy
Pandu
Kavithalaya Krishnan as Krishnan
Sathyapriya
Chandrakala as Chandra
Baby Sowmya as Valli
Kovai Senthil
T.V. Saravanan as Vadivelu
Oru Viral Krishna Rao as Tea master
Idichapuli Selvaraj
Thideer Kannaiah
Haja Sheriff
Salem Vijayaraj
Mahesh
Nandakumar
Premit Kumar
Kottai Perumal

Soundtrack

The film score and the soundtrack were composed by Deva. The soundtrack, released in 1998, features 5 tracks with lyrics written by director Agathiyan.

Reception
The film did reasonably well at the box office.

References

1998 films
Indian drama films
Films scored by Deva (composer)
1990s Tamil-language films